The 2016 NCAA Division I Football Championship Game was a postseason college football game that determined a national champion in the NCAA Division I Football Championship Subdivision for the 2015 season. It was played at Toyota Stadium in Frisco, Texas, on January 9, 2016, with kickoff at 12:00 noon EST, and was the culminating game of the 2015 FCS Playoffs. With sponsorship from Northwestern Mutual, the game was officially known as the NCAA FCS Football Championship Presented by Northwestern Mutual.

Teams
The participants of the 2016 NCAA Division I Football Championship Game were the finalists of the 2015 FCS Playoffs, which began with a 24-team bracket. No. 1 seed Jacksonville State and No. 3 seed North Dakota State qualified for the final by winning their semifinal games.

Jacksonville State Gamecocks

The Gamecocks, led by second-year head coach John Grass, finished the regular season 10–1, 8–0 in OVC play, to earn a conference championship and the No. 1 seed in the FCS Playoffs. Jacksonville State defeated unseeded Chattanooga, No. 8 seed Charleston Southern, and unseeded Sam Houston State to reach their first ever final.

North Dakota State Bison

The Bison, led by second-year head coach Chris Klieman, finished the regular season 8–2, 7–1 in MVFC play, to earn a conference co-championship (shared with Illinois State) and the No. 3 seed in the FCS Playoffs. North Dakota State defeated unseeded Montana, unseeded Northern Iowa, and No. 7 seed Richmond to reach the final. The Bison entered the Championship game with a 4–0 record in previous FCS Championships, having won the last four straight.

Game summary

Scoring summary

Game statistics

References

Further reading

External links
Box score at ESPN
2016 FCS Championship Jacksonville State vs North Dakota State via YouTube

Championship Game
NCAA Division I Football Championship Games
Jacksonville State Gamecocks football games
North Dakota State Bison football games
American football in the Dallas–Fort Worth metroplex
Sports in Frisco, Texas
NCAA Division I Football Championship Game
NCAA Division I Football Championship Game